The Waputik Range lies west of the upper Bow Valley, east of Bath Creek, and south of Balfour Creek in the Canadian Rockies. "Waputik" means "white goat" in Stoney.  The range was named in 1884 by George Mercer Dawson of the Geological Survey of Canada. The President Range lies within the Waputik Range.

The Waputik Range should not be confused with the much larger Waputik Mountains which encompasses this range and other peaks along the Continental Divide in Yoho National Park.

Peaks
 Howse Peak , highest in the Waputik Mountains
 Mount Balfour 3272m
 Mount Patterson 3191m
 Mount Baker 3180m
 Mont des Poilus 3166m
 Mount Gordon 3161m
 The President	3123m
 Caldron Peak 2909m
 Wapta Mountain 2782m
 Waputik Peak 2755m
 Pulpit Peak 2720m

Gallery

References

Ranges of the Canadian Rockies
Mountain ranges of Alberta
Mountain ranges of British Columbia
Alberta's Rockies